Lulwa Ahmed Al-Mansoori (born November 21, 1979) is a researcher and novelist from Julphar in Ras Al Khaimah, United Arab Emirates. Member of the Emirates Writers Union Board of Directors - responsible for publishing and distribution. She obtained a Bachelor’s degree in Arabic literature, a diploma in cultural heritage management, and a certificate in restoring documents and manuscripts.

Novels 
• “Aakher Nisaa Lanjaa” (The Last Women of Linh) a short story published by the Department of Culture and Information, Sharjah

• “Kharajna Min Dile Jabal” (We came out of the mountainside) published by the Arab House of Science Publishers, Beirut

• “Kaws Alramil (Mulhat Albahru Wa Almaa)” (Arc al-Raml (The Comedy of Cradle and Water)) published by Dar Al-Ain for Publishing, Cairo

Story collections 
 “Kabur Tahta Raasi” (A grave under my head) a short story published by the Department of Culture and Information, Sharjah
 “Alkariya Allati Tanamu Fi Jaibi” (The Village That Sleeps in My Pocket) by Kuttab Publication, Dubai

Awards 
 Lulwa Al-Mansoori has won several awards, including:
 The short story collection "The Village That Sleeps in My Pocket" won the Dubai Cultural Award for the year 2013
 The novel "We Got Out of a Jabal Ridge" won the 2014 Emirates Prize for Fiction
 She won first place for the short story collection "A Tomb Under My Head" at the Sharjah Prize for Arab Creativity for the year 2014
 The story (A Very Deep White Darkness) won the Juma Al Fayrouz Award for Short Story in 2015

Memberships 
 Member of the Emirates Writers Union
 Member of the Emirates Women Writers Association
 Member of the editorial board of (House of Narration) magazine
 Member of the International Prize for Arabic Fiction Symposium 2013

References 

1979 births
Living people
Women novelists
Arab writers